Portal de Suba is one of the terminus stations of the TransMilenio mass-transit system of Bogotá, Colombia, which opened in the year 2000.

Location

Portal de Suba is located in northwestern Bogotá, specifically on Avenida Suba with Avenida Ciudad de Cali.

History

The station opened April 29, 2006 after several months of construction delays on the line. The largest delay was in the construction of the underpass at the intersection of Avenida Suba with NQS and Avenida Calle 80.

It is one of the two termini that serve the locality of Suba (the other being the Portal del Norte).

Nearby is the Imperial shopping center, with its anchor Carrefour and the Éxito of Suba.

Station services

Main line service

Feeder routes

The station has the following feeder routes:
  Avenida Suba loop
  San Andrés loop
  Villamaría loop
  Aures loop
  Avenida Cali loop
  Las Mercedes loop
  Pinar loop
  La Gaitana loop
  Lisboa loop
  Bilbao loop

Intermunicipal services 
In the outside part of the Portal of Suba there is a Satellite Transport Parabiter from where they leave intermunicipal buses with different destinies to the nearby municipalities like Cota and Chía.

External links
 TransMilenio

See also
 Bogotá
 TransMilenio
 List of TransMilenio Stations

TransMilenio
Suba